Prickle planar cell polarity protein 2 is a protein that in humans is encoded by the PRICKLE2 gene.

Function

This gene encodes a homolog of Drosophila prickle. The exact function of this gene is not known, however, studies in mice suggest that it may be involved in seizure prevention. Mutations in this gene are associated with progressive myoclonic epilepsy type 5. [provided by RefSeq, Dec 2011].

References

Further reading